Disha (English: Direction) was a 1990 Hindi film directed by Sai Paranjpye, based on the plight of immigrant workers in urban India, starring Shabana Azmi, Nana Patekar and Om Puri in lead roles.

The film was a part of the Indian Panorama at the International Film Festival of India. It was awarded the Best Jury and Most Popular film award at Rencontres Cinematographiques.

Cast
 Shabana Azmi
 Nana Patekar 
 Rizwan Shaikh
 Om Puri
 Raghuvir Yadav
 Nilu Phule
 Sayaji Shinde
 Rajshree Sawant
 Achyut Potdar
 Prashant Subhedar
 Jayamala Inamdar
 Datta Rane
 Jairaj Nayar
 Vijay Parulkar
 Riju Bajaj
 Anil Bhagwat

References

Further reading
  Bombay and the Village in 1990s Women's Cinema, Rashmi Sawhney, Journal: Film Studies, Volume 11, 2007.

External links
 

1990 films
1990s Hindi-language films
Films directed by Sai Paranjpye
Films scored by Anand Modak